This is a list of Perth Scorchers records and statistics in the Big Bash League, an Australian cricket series.

Records

Team records

Result summary v. opponent

Batting records

Most runs

Bowling records

Partnerships

References 

Perth Scorchers (WBBL)